The Path of the King is a 1921 novel by the Scottish author John Buchan, presented as a loosely-coupled series of short stories.

Prologue
In a prologue to the novel, three men discuss around a campfire the notion that the 'spark' of masterful men may be transmitted down from generation to generation, and even though it may smoulder for generations and may seem lost, will reappear and flare up when the time is right.

Plot

The novel takes the form of a loosely-coupled collection of short stories presenting a sweeping tapestry of historical episodes, from the Vikings through centuries of Norman, French, Flemish, English, Scottish and American scenes.

In the first episode, a Northern prince's golden torque is the symbol of his royal status. On his death the gold is remodelled as a ring, which is handed down from generation to generation until it is eventually inherited by the mother of Abraham Lincoln. The young Abe, using it as a sinker for his fishing line, loses it in a "crick" and is distraught.  On her deathbed, Abe's mother recognises the potential for kingliness in her young son and dies content, realising that the ring is needed no more.

In an epilogue to the novel, set many years later, three men stand watching the funeral cortège after Lincoln's death. "There goes the first American" says one. The young British attaché replies, "I dare say you are right, Professor, but I think it is also the last of the Kings."

Critical reception 

Although a favourite of GM Trevelyan, other early critics of the book were less enthusiastic. The Times Literary Supplement considered the work "disappointing", and criticised it for its "pseudo-romantic vocabulary" and "the use of slightly pretentious and unusual words and locutions where common and more vigorous ones would serve better".

In The Interpreter's House (1975), David Daniell noted that The Path of the King marked the beginning of Buchan's historical writing. He considered the 'feel' of the many atmospheres to be well done, and the narratives to be 'fresh and good'.

In his 2009 essay John Buchan, America and the ‘British World’, 1904-40 Peter Henshaw suggested that Buchan had the implicit purpose of fostering Anglo-American unity, and that his aim in writing the novel was to build up Lincoln as a shared hero of the British and American people. He took the epilogue as being a restatement of the view that Lincoln's highest achievement was his defence of the American Union, "a grand geopolitical association comparable in Buchan's mind to the British Empire".

Writing for the John Buchan Society website, JCG Greig suggested that the fascination of this book grows on the reader gradually, and that in order to grasp the consistency of the tale little clues have to be looked for constantly.  Buchan presents Lincoln's Presidency in the American Civil War as nothing less than kingly. The choice of Lincoln, the product of ordinary parents, proclaims that kingliness does not depend upon outward trappings but on inward riches. Greig considered it a book "especially for the historically minded to dwell on and even drool over".

References

External links
 
 The Path of the King at Project Gutenberg

1921 British novels
British historical novels
Hodder & Stoughton books
Novels by John Buchan